In enzymology, a proclavaminate amidinohydrolase is an enzyme that catalyzes the chemical reaction

amidinoproclavaminate + H2O  proclavaminate + urea

Thus, the two substrates of this enzyme are amidinoproclavaminate and H2O, whereas its two products are proclavaminate and urea.

This enzyme belongs to the family of hydrolases, those acting on carbon-nitrogen bonds other than peptide bonds, specifically in linear amidines.  The systematic name of this enzyme class is amidinoproclavaminate amidinohydrolase. Other names in common use include PAH, and proclavaminate amidino hydrolase.  This enzyme participates in clavulanic acid biosynthesis.

References

 
 
 
 

EC 3.5.3
Enzymes of unknown structure